Lough Golagh is a freshwater lake in the northwest of Ireland. It is located in south County Donegal.

Geography

Natural history
Lough Golagh forms part of the Lough Golagh and Breesy Hill Special Area of Conservation. An island in the lake supports important bird species including common tern and black-headed gull.

See also
List of loughs in Ireland

References

Golagh